Don't Tell Anyone  is a 2015 documentary film directed by Mikaela Shwer. It focuses on immigrant activist Angy Rivera as she shares her parallel journey of coming out of the shadows as undocumented and as a survivor of sexual abuse.  Aco-production with Latino Public Broadcasting with additional support from ITVS., it premiered as part of PBS's POV series on September 21, 2015.

Background 

In 2014 there were 11.3 million unauthorized immigrants in the U.S.  the Obama administration deported a record 438,421 of them, with more than 2 million deportations since Obama took office.

Synopsis 

Since the age of four, Angy Rivera has lived in the United States with a secret that threatens to upend her life: She is undocumented. Now 24 and facing an uncertain future, Rivera becomes an activist for undocumented youth with a popular advice blog, Ask Angy, and a YouTube channel boasting more than 27,000 views. She steps out of the shadows a second time to share her story of sexual abuse and how it shapes her and her mother's journey through the visa process.

Production 

Shwer first reached out to Rivera after reading an article about her in the New York Daily News. She followed Angy for the next three years including through the process of applying for a U visa, which is set aside for victims of crimes (and their immediate family members) who have suffered substantial mental or physical abuse and are willing to assist law enforcement and government officials in the investigation or prosecution of the criminal activity.

References

External links

2015 television films
2015 films
2015 documentary films
POV (TV series) films
Documentary films about immigration to the United States
Documentary films about violence against women
2010s American films